Cláudio André Mergen Taffarel (born 8 May 1966) is a Brazilian retired footballer who played as a goalkeeper, and is the goalkeeping coach of English Premier League club Liverpool and the Brazil national team. During an 18-year career he played professionally for five different clubs in both Brazil and Europe. He began his senior career in 1985 with Brazilian side Internacional, whereas his latter clubs were Parma, Reggiana, Atlético Mineiro, and Galatasaray; he ended his career in 2003, after a second spell with Italian team Parma.

The recipient of more than 100 caps for Brazil, Taffarel helped the national team win the 1994 World Cup, also appearing in eight other major international tournaments over the course of one full decade, most notably helping Brazil to a second place in the 1998 World Cup, and two Copa América titles in 1989 and 1997; he also won a silver medal at the 1988 Summer Olympic Games.

Club career
Born in Santa Rosa, Rio Grande do Sul from Italian Brazilians ancestry, Taffarel began his career playing for Internacional but only appeared in 14 Série A games during his five-year spell, being however awarded the Golden Ball award for the 1988 season. In 1990, he moved abroad and joined Parma in Italy, a club which had been freshly promoted to Serie A for the first time in its history; according to a 2003 article by Andrea Schianchi of La Gazzetta dello Sport, Taffarel's move to Parma was also carried out for commercial reasons, as at the time, Calisto Tanzi, the then–owner of Parmalat – the company that owned the club –, was looking to have the Brazilian goalkeeper become the face of the corporation's new advertising campaign following its recent expansion into Brazil. Taffarel became the first non–Italian goalkeeper to play in Serie A, and proceeded to appear in all 34 league games in the following campaign under manager Nevio Scala, as the Emilia-Romagna side finished in sixth position and qualified to the UEFA Cup. He won the Coppa Italia in 1992 and the Cup Winners' Cup in 1993 during his first spell with the club, although following a series of unconvincing performances, and the regulations at the time that only allowed three non–Italian players in the team's starting XI (with Faustino Asprilla, Tomas Brolin, and Georges Grün usually being selected to start by Scala), he was relegated to the bench over the course of the next two seasons, initially behind Marco Ballotta and later Luca Bucci.

In 1993, Taffarel, now only a back-up at Parma, signed for fellow Serie A team Reggiana, where he was first-choice throughout the following season in a narrow escape from relegation. However, he was subsequently dropped from the first team in 1994, and remained without a professional club in the run up to and following that year's World Cup in the United States, playing instead at amateur level with his local church team, and even featuring as a centre-forward on occasion. Afterwards, he returned to his home country in 1995 and played three years with Atlético Mineiro.

On 24 June 1998, when still appearing for Seleçao at 1998 FIFA World Cup tournament in France, Taffarel signed a two-year deal with Galatasaray at Disneyland Paris. Galatasaray paid a transfer fee of around $1.5 million to his former club Atlético Mineiro. At Galatasaray, he has won six major trophies during his three-year stint, most notably two Süper Lig titles and the 1999–2000 UEFA Cup and 2000 UEFA Super Cup; in the final of the latter competition – a 4–1 penalty shootout victory over Arsenal following a 0–0 draw after 120 minutes – he was chosen as Man of the match. He closed out his career with former club Parma, joining the team in 2001; he mainly featured as a second-choice keeper behind Sébastien Frey during his second spell with the club, but started in both legs of the 2002 Coppa Italia Final, which saw Parma triumph over the newly crowned Serie A champions, Juventus. He retired in 2003, after one-and-a-half seasons with the club, at the age of 37, and after having refused an offer from Empoli: his car broke while he was going to sign the contract, which he later described as a "sign of God".

International career
Taffarel made his debut for Brazil on 7 July 1988 in the Australia Bicentenary Gold Cup, playing all four games and conceding two goals as his team won the tournament. He was also in goal for the following year's Copa América, which Brazil also won (during his ten-year international career, he appeared in five editions of the latter tournament, winning the title for a second time in 1997, and collecting runners-up medals in 1991 and 1995). At the 1988 Summer Olympics in Seoul, he won a silver medal, saving three penalties against West Germany in the semi-finals of the tournament: one in regulation time, and two in Brazil's successful shoot-out. He was also a member of the Brazilian team that took part at the 1990 FIFA World Cup in Italy, where Brazil were eliminated in the round of 16 following a 1–0 defeat to rivals and defending champions Argentina, with Taffarel conceding only two goals in total throughout the tournament.

Taffarel was the starter for the nation during the 1994 FIFA World Cup in the United States, only allowing one goal in the first round and two in the knock-out phases, excluding two penalty kicks in the final shootout victory against Italy. Four years later, in France, he helped his national team to a second consecutive World Cup final, which proved to be his final international appearance; on this occasion, however, Brazil lost out 3–0 to the hosts. In the run-up to the final, Taffarel had notably saved two penalties in the team's 4–2 shootout victory over the Netherlands in the semi-finals. He was also a member of the Brazilian side that finished in third place at the 1998 CONCACAF Gold Cup.

In total, Taffarel played 101 times with the Seleção, making him Brazil's most capped goalkeeper of all time, and one of the few Brazilian players to have made at least 100 caps for the national side. Upon his retirement in 2003, coach Carlos Alberto Parreira offered to arrange a farewell match but the player refused, stating that he was not interested in such fanfare; he did return to play alongside Romário in late 2004 against Mexico, to commemorate the 1994 World Cup victory at the Los Angeles Memorial Coliseum.

Style of play
Regarded as one of the greatest Brazilian goalkeepers of all time, Taffarel was known to be a rational, effective, and generally consistent keeper, with good fundamental goalkeeping technique, who favoured an efficient rather than spectacular playing style. His main attributes were his explosive reflexes, positional sense, and calm composure in goal, as well as his penalty-stopping abilities; due to the muscle power in his legs that he developed while playing beach volleyball in his youth, he was known for his surprising spring and elevation from a standstill position, despite his modest stature, which gave him significant hang time and aided him in stopping penalties. Furthermore, he was known to be quick when coming off his line, and was also highly regarded for his flair and skill with the ball at his feet, having played as a forward in his youth. Due to his lack of height, however, as well as his poor handling and decision-making, he struggled at times when dealing with crosses, and was not particularly confident or decisive when coming off his line to catch high balls; as such, critical reception of Taffarel was often divided throughout his career. While he drew praise from the Brazilian fans and media for his decisive performances with the Brazil national team, which even earned him the nickname "Saint Taffarel" in the Brazilian media, he also drew criticism at times from Italian pundits over the mental aspect of his game, and his lack of development during his time in Serie A, which made him unreliable and prone to technical errors on occasion, despite his shot-stopping ability and generally high-quality gameplay, as well as his capacity to produce excellent saves. Moreover, his struggles to cope with his nerves are thought to have impeded him from succeeding consistently at the highest level with top European clubs throughout his career, despite his success and reputation. Ahead of the 1998 FIFA World Cup Final, Mike Penner of the Los Angeles Times speculated that Taffarel, and the goalkeeping position more broadly, was the "weak link" of an otherwise world class Brazil national side, due to the lack of top goalkeepers in Brazilian football at the time; indeed, prior to the tournament, Reuters had dismissed Taffarel as: "One of around a dozen goalkeepers in Brazil of roughly the same standard."

Post-retirement 

Taffarel and his former Atlético Mineiro teammate Paulo Roberto started up a player agency, with the focus mainly on promising youngsters.

During the 1998 World Cup, when the Brazil national team was training at Trois-Sapins stadium in Ozoir-la-Ferrière, a suburb southeast of Paris, the town's mayor proposed renaming the stadium after him.

In 2004, Taffarel rejoined Galatasaray as goalkeeper coach – under former teammate Gheorghe Hagi – returning to the club for the 2011–12 season, again with Fatih Terim as manager. Taffarel had two short spells as interim manager before leaving the Turkish side in 2019.

He currently works as a goalkeeper coach for both Liverpool, having joined in 2021, and the Brazil national team, having taken up the role in 2014.

Personal life
Born in Santa Rosa, Rio Grande do Sul, Brazil, Taffarel is of German and Italian descent.

Taffarel is a born-again Christian who has actively shared his faith in numerous venues. He was a member of the Fellowship of Christian Athletes since 1988, and has 17 children, 15 of them adopted.

Career statistics

Club

International

Honours

Club
Parma
 Coppa Italia: 1991–92, 2001–02
 UEFA Cup Winners' Cup: 1992–93

Atlético Mineiro
 Campeonato Mineiro: 1995
 Copa CONMEBOL: 1997

Galatasaray
 Süper Lig: 1998–99, 1999–2000
 Turkish Cup: 1998–99, 1999–2000
 UEFA Cup: 1999–2000
 UEFA Super Cup: 2000

International
Brazil
 FIFA World Cup: 1994; Runner-up 1998
 Copa América: 1989, 1997; Runner-up 1991, 1995
 Summer Olympic Games: Silver medal 1988
 FIFA World Youth Championship: 1985

Individual
 Toulon Tournament Best Goalkeeper: 1987
 Bola de Ouro: 1988
 Bola de Prata: 1988
 FIFA XI: 1998
 Brazilian Football Museum Hall of Fame
 Man of the Match: 2000 UEFA Cup Final

See also
 List of footballers with 100 or more caps

References

External links

 Profile at the Liverpool F.C. website
 
 
 
 
 

1966 births
Living people
Brazilian Pentecostals
Brazilian people of German descent
Brazilian people of Italian descent
People from Santa Rosa, Rio Grande do Sul
Sportspeople from Rio Grande do Sul
Brazilian footballers
Association football goalkeepers
Sport Club Internacional players
Parma Calcio 1913 players
A.C. Reggiana 1919 players
Galatasaray S.K. footballers
Clube Atlético Mineiro players
Campeonato Brasileiro Série A players
Serie A players
Süper Lig players
UEFA Cup winning players
Brazil under-20 international footballers
Olympic footballers of Brazil
Brazil international footballers
Footballers at the 1987 Pan American Games
Footballers at the 1988 Summer Olympics
1989 Copa América players
1990 FIFA World Cup players
1991 Copa América players
1993 Copa América players
1994 FIFA World Cup players
1995 Copa América players
1997 Copa América players
1998 CONCACAF Gold Cup players
1998 FIFA World Cup players
Medalists at the 1987 Pan American Games
Pan American Games gold medalists for Brazil
Pan American Games medalists in football
Olympic silver medalists for Brazil
Olympic medalists in football
Medalists at the 1988 Summer Olympics
Copa América-winning players
FIFA World Cup-winning players
FIFA Century Club
Brazilian expatriate footballers
Brazilian expatriate sportspeople in Italy
Brazilian expatriate sportspeople in Turkey
Expatriate footballers in Italy
Expatriate footballers in Turkey
Brazilian football managers
Association football goalkeeping coaches
Galatasaray S.K. (football) non-playing staff
Galatasaray S.K. (football) managers
Süper Lig managers
Brazilian expatriate football managers
Expatriate football managers in Turkey
Liverpool F.C. non-playing staff